Francesca Mary Unsworth (born 29 December 1957) is a British journalist and media executive. Since January 2018 she has been  Director, News & Current Affairs for BBC News. She was appointed in succession to James Harding. Before then she served in various senior positions in the BBC, including director of the BBC World Service Group. Previously she was acting director of News at the BBC from November 2012 until August 2013 and a member of the BBC's executive board. In 2013 she was appointed deputy director of News and Current Affairs.

Early life and education
Unsworth was born on 1957 in Stoke-on-Trent, Staffordshire. She attended St Dominic's High School, Stoke-on-Trent, a direct grant grammar school. She studied drama at the University of Manchester but was unable to get into a drama school and so switched careers to publishing in London.

BBC career
Unsworth began her broadcasting career in local radio, working at BBC Radio Leicester and BBC Radio Bristol, before going on to become producer of Radio 1's Newsbeat. In 1990, she moved to Radio 4 and was based in Washington as a radio producer for the network during the Gulf crisis of 1990–1991. She worked as a producer on The World at One and PM while at Radio 4.

She moved to the BBC's Newsgathering Department in 1993, where she had responsibility for UK domestic news, and was a producer and editor for the BBC One O'Clock News and the BBC Six O'Clock News. Unsworth was appointed Head of Newsgathering in January 2005.

In December 2005, Unsworth appeared on the BBC's Newswatch programme, responding to accusations of double standards in BBC News reporting of racial crimes when white people were the victims. Complainants suggested the BBC buried stories such as the racist murder of Kriss Donald, with comparable murders involving black victims given twelve times more coverage and the opening of an arts centre in Gateshead reported in preference to Donald's murder. Unsworth admitted the case had not been covered sufficiently and that there had been space to do so. Her department again failed to cover the case adequately the following year. In 2011, BBC News was criticised for referring to looters in the 2011 London riots as "protesters", even two days into the violence. In response to 62 complaints about the matter, Unsworth conceded that the BBC had been wrong to do so.

In November 2012, Unsworth was appointed acting director of News after Helen Boaden stepped aside while Nick Pollard prepared his report into the BBC's non-coverage of the Jimmy Savile sexual abuse scandal. She ceased working in this role in August 2013 and was appointed deputy director of News and Current Affairs. In November 2013, Unsworth was replaced as Head of Newsgathering by Jonathan Munro.

In August 2014, Unsworth ordered helicopter filming of a police raid on a mansion belonging to singer Cliff Richard. The coverage led to Richard suing the BBC for breach of privacy. On 8 May 2018, The Guardian reported: "Sir Cliff Richard is seeking a payment of at least £560,000 from the BBC following the broadcaster's coverage of a police raid at his home in 2014". In July, Richard was awarded £210,000 in damages and the BBC agreed to pay £2 million in legal costs. Unsworth apologised to Richard and stated that "there were elements of its coverage that should have been handled differently" but criticised the ruling as an attack on liberty and press freedoms.

In January 2018, she was invited to present evidence at a parliamentary select committee meeting on gender pay gap at the BBC. This was initiated by the resignation of the then China editor Carrie Gracie in the same month over the same issue. Unsworth defended the pay gap between Grace and the BBC's North America editor Jon Sopel as Sopel was "on air twice as much" and that "The China job [is] a more features-based agenda". Gracie also reported that Unsworth had privately commented to a colleague that the pay gap was due to her being part-time. Unsworth denied this stating "I did the contract, I knew she wasn't" but apologised to her for causing a 'misunderstanding' due to 'loose' language. BBC and Gracie agreed to an equal pay deal in June 2018 and she donated the back pay awarded to charity.

In September 2021, it was announced that Unsworth will leave the BBC in 2022 after 40 years.

Other roles
Unsworth was president of the Society of Editors between 2011 and 2012, and is a board member of the organisation. She is also a board member of the European Union's Erasmus Mundus programme.

References

External links
 
  Unsworth's BBC blog

1957 births
Alumni of the University of Manchester
BBC executives
BBC News people
BBC Radio 4
British radio executives
Living people
People from Newcastle-under-Lyme